Patrick Calcagni (born 5 July 1977) is a Swiss professional road bicycle racer who rode for UCI Professional Continental team Barloworld until the team's demise.

Major results

 2007 Tour de Romandie - Sprints Competition
 Tour of Japan - 1 stage (2001)
  Time Trial Champion (2000)
  U19 Road Race Champion (1995)
 3rd (1994)

External links 
Profile at Liquigas official website

Swiss male cyclists
1977 births
Living people
People from Sorengo
Sportspeople from Ticino